Brazil is scheduled to compete at the 2017 World Aquatics Championships in Budapest, Hungary from 14 July to 30 July.

Medalists

Diving

Brazil has entered 6 divers (two male and four female).

Men

Women

Mixed

High diving

Brazil qualified one male and one female high divers.

Open water swimming

Brazil has entered six open water swimmers

Swimming

Brazilian swimmers have so far achieved qualifying standards in the following events (up to a maximum of 2 swimmers in each event at the Olympic Qualifying Time (OQT), and potentially 1 at the Olympic Selection Time (OST)):

A total of 16 swimmers, 13 men and 3 women, were named to the Brazilian team for the Worlds on May 11, 2017.

Men

Women

Synchronized swimming

Brazil's synchronized swimming team consisted of 5 athletes (1 male and 4 female).

Women

Mixed

 Legend: (R) = Reserve Athlete

Water polo

Brazil's men's water polo team qualified for the World Championships with a gold medal performance at the 2017 UANA Cup in Couva, Trinidad and Tobago.

Men's tournament

Team roster

Slobodan Soro (C)
Anderson Cruz
Guilherme Almeida
Gustavo Coutinho
Luis Ricardo Silva
Ricardo Guimarães
Pedro Stellet
Mateus Stellet
Bernardo Rocha
Heitor Carrulo
Gustavo Guimarães
Roberto Freitas
Leonardo Silva

Group play

Playoffs

9th–12th place semifinals

Eleventh place game

Women's tournament

Team roster

Victória Chamorro
Diana Abla
Marina Zablith (C)
Julia Souza
Ana Alice Amaral
Kemily Leão
Samantha Ferreira
Mylla Bruzzo
Melani Dias
Viviane Bahia
Mariana Duarte
Letícia Belorio
Raquel Sá

Group play

13th–16th place semifinals

13th place game

References

Nations at the 2017 World Aquatics Championships
2017
World Aquatics Championships